Otvovice is a municipality and village in Kladno District in the Central Bohemian Region of the Czech Republic. It has about 800 inhabitants.

Notable people
Lucie Bílá (born 1966), singer

References

Villages in Kladno District